Giacomo Vrioni (born 15 October 1998) is a professional footballer who plays as a forward for Major League Soccer club New England Revolution. Born in Italy, he represents the Albania national team.

Club career

Sampdoria
Born in San Severino Marche, Macerata, before Vrioni joined Sampdoria, he played in Serie D side Matelica where he made four appearances. In January 2015, Vrioni joined the Sampdoria youth system where he played a total of 58 matches, scoring 20 goals and making 6 assists. In the 2016–17 season he was also an unused substitute two times: once in Serie A against Palermo and once in Coppa Italia against Cagliari.

Loan to Pistoiese
On 20 July 2017, Vrioni was signed by Serie C club Pistoiese on a season-long loan deal. On 17 September he made his Serie C debut for Pistoiese as a substitute replacing Devis Nossa in the 67th minute and in the 74th minute he scored his first professional goal in a 1–1 away draw against Pro Piacenza. On 4 October, Vrioni played his first match for the club as a starter, a 0–0 away draw against Olbia, and was replaced by Claudio Zappa in the 69th minute. On 23 October he scored his second goal in the 8th minute of a 2–2 away draw against Pontedera. On 17 December he played his first entire match for Pistoiese and recorded his first career hat-trick in a 3–1 home win over Gavorrano. Vrioni ended his loan to Pistoiese with 27 appearances, 8 goals and 4 assists.

Loan to Venezia
On 9 July 2018, Vrioni was loaned to Serie B side Venezia on a season-long loan deal. On 5 August he made his debut in a 1–0 home defeat against Südtirol in the second round of Coppa Italia. On 26 August he made his Serie B debut in a 1–0 home win over Spezia, he was replaced by Alexandre Geijo after 76 minutes. Four months later, on 3 December, Vrioni scored his first goal in Serie B for the club in the 46th minute of a 1–1 away draw against Foggia. Vrioni ended his season-long loan to Venezia with 25 appearances, including 11 as a starter, 1 goal and 2 assists, but he played only 4 entire matches.

Loan to Cittadella
On 19 July 2019, Vrioni joined Serie B side Cittadella on loan until 30 June 2020. On 18 August, he made his debut for Cittadella as a substitute replacing Davide Diaw in the 84th minute of a match won at penalties in the third round of Coppa Italia against Carpi. Six days later, on 24 August, he made his league debut for the club as a substitute replacing Giuseppe Panico in the 81st minute of a 3–0 home defeat against Spezia. On 31 August he played his first match as a starter for Cittadella, a 4–1 away defeat against Benevento, and was replaced by Alberto Paleari after 46 minutes. In January 2020, Vrioni was re-called from Sampdoria leaving Cittadella with only 5 appearances.

Juventus
On 30 January 2020, Vrioni joined Juventus for an undisclosed fee; they moved him to their reserve team Juventus U23 in the Serie C. He made his professional debut, and Serie A debut, with the first team on 1 August 2020, in a 3–1 home defeat against Roma, coming on as a second–half substitute for Gonzalo Higuaín. On 27 November 2020, he injured his fibula, forcing him on the sidelines for five months. Vrioni returned from injury on 25 April 2021, playing in a home 1–0 win against Carrarese; he also scored the winning goal from the penalty spot.

Loan to WSG Tirol 
On 5 July 2021, Vrioni was loaned to WSG Tirol in the Austrian Bundesliga. On 17 July, Vrioni made his debut for WSG Tirol in a 3–0 away win against Leobendorf in the first round of the Austrian Cup, scoring his first goal for the club.

New England Revolution

On 5 July 2022, Vrioni signed a three-year deal with Major League Soccer side New England Revolution. His transfer fee was reportedly close to $4 million. On October 1, 2022, Vrioni scored his first goal for the club when he drew and converted himself a penalty past Atlanta Uniteds Goalkeeper Raúl Gudiño.

International career

Italy
Vrioni represented Italy at the Under-18 and Under-19 levels. On 9 March 2016 he made his debut at the U-18 level as a substitute replacing Simone Lo Faso in the 61st minute of a 1–1 home draw against Switzerland U-18. On 11 August 2016, Vrioni made his U-19 debut in a 1–0 home defeat against Croatia U-19, where he played the entire match. On 6 September 2016 he scored his first international goal, as a substitute, in the 94th minute of a 3–1 home win over Turkey U-19.

Albania
In September 2018 he switched his allegiance to his country of origin, Albania, after being called up to their Under-21 side for a friendly against his country of birth, Italy. He earned his first cap in this match, netting a last-minute equalizer in an eventual 3–1 defeat, as the Italian side scored two goals in injury time.

Vrioni made his senior debut for Albania on 14 October 2018, coming on as a second–half substitute in a 2–0 away defeat to Israel in the UEFA Nations League.

Career statistics

Club

International

Honours
Juventus U23
 Coppa Italia Serie C: 2019–20

Juventus
 Serie A: 2019–20

References

External links
 
 

Living people
1998 births
Sportspeople from the Province of Macerata
Albanian footballers
Italian footballers
Italian people of Albanian descent
Association football forwards
S.S. Matelica Calcio 1921 players
U.C. Sampdoria players
U.S. Pistoiese 1921 players
Venezia F.C. players
A.S. Cittadella players
Juventus Next Gen players
Juventus F.C. players
WSG Tirol players
New England Revolution players
Serie A players
Serie B players
Serie C players
Serie D players
Austrian Football Bundesliga players
Italy youth international footballers
Albania under-21 international footballers
Albania international footballers
Albanian expatriate footballers
Italian expatriate footballers
Albanian expatriate sportspeople in Austria
Italian expatriate sportspeople in Austria
Albanian expatriate sportspeople in the United States
Italian expatriate sportspeople in the United States
Expatriate footballers in Austria
Expatriate soccer players in the United States
Footballers from Marche
Designated Players (MLS)
Major League Soccer players